was a town located in Echi District, Shiga Prefecture, Japan. "Aitō" means "eastern Echi".

It was founded February 11th 1971.

As of 2003, the town had an estimated population of 5,826 and a density of 142.48 persons per km2. The total area was 40.89 km2.

On February 11, 2005, Aitō, along with the city of Yōkaichi, the towns of Eigenji and Gokashō (both from Kanzaki District), and the town of Kotō (also from Echi District), was merged to create the city of Higashiōmi.

Dissolved municipalities of Shiga Prefecture